The Hokan  language family is a hypothetical grouping of a dozen small language families that were spoken mainly in California, Arizona and Baja California.

Etymology
The name Hokan is loosely based on the word for "two" in the various Hokan languages: *xwak in Proto-Yuman, c-oocj (pronounced ) in Seri, ha'k in Achumawi, etc.

History of the proposal
The "Hokan hypothesis" was first proposed in 1913 by Roland B. Dixon and Alfred L. Kroeber, and further elaborated by Edward Sapir. Initial follow-up research found little additional evidence that that these language families were related to each other. But since about 1950, increased efforts to document Hokan languages and to establish sound correspondences in proposed lexical resemblance sets have added weight to the Hokan hypothesis, leading to its acceptance by many specialists in the languages of California, Oregon, and Mesoamerica. However, some skepticism remains among scholars.

Linguist Paul Rivet claimed the Yurumanguí language of Colombia was part of the Hokan family. This claim has not been accepted by historical linguists.  Terrence Kaufman wondered if Hokan might be related to Oto-Mangean of Central America.

An automated computational analysis (ASJP 4) by Müller et al. (2013) found lexical similarities among Seri, Yuman and Tequistlatecan. However, since the analysis was automatically generated, the grouping could be either due to mutual lexical borrowing or genetic inheritance.

Distribution
The geographic distribution of the Hokan languages suggests that they became separated around the Central Valley of California by the influx of later-arriving Penutian and other peoples; archaeological evidence for this is summarized in Chase-Dunn & Mann (1998). These languages are spoken by Native American communities around and east of Mount Shasta, others near Lake Tahoe, the Pomo on the California coast, and the Yuman peoples along the lower Colorado River. Some linguists also include Chumash, between San Francisco and Los Angeles, and other families, but the evidence is insubstantial, and most now restrict Hokan to some or all of the languages listed below.

Languages
The Hokan languages retained by Kaufman (1988) due to regular sound correspondences and common core vocabulary are as follows. (The data on which these conclusions were drawn have not been published or evaluated by anyone else.) Apart from Shasta–Palaihnihan and Yuman, all branches are single languages or shallow families.

 Chimariko
 Yana/Yahi
 Karuk
 Shasta–Palaihnihan
 Shastan (4)
 Palaihnihan (2)
 Pomoan (7)
 Washo
 Esselen
 Salinan
 Yuman (12)
Seri
Coahuilteco
Comecrudan (3)
Tequistlatecan (3)
Jicaquean (Tolan, 2)

Marlett (2008) reevaluated the evidence and concluded that the evidence for Seri and Salinan has not been systematically or convincingly presented. The inclusion of the Tequistlatecan languages has also not received much support. The Chumash languages were once included, but that position has been almost universally abandoned.

Zhivlov (2013)
A lexicostatistical classification of the Hokan languages by Zhivlov (2013) is roughly presented as follows.

Northern: Chimariko, Karuk, Shasta, Palaihnihan
Southern
Pomoan, Salinan
Yana, Seri, Tequistlatecan (Chontal), Yuman

Zhivlov (2013) does not consider Jicaquean (Tol) and Washo to be Hokan languages.

Vocabulary
Some Hokan lexical correspondences from Mary R. Haas (1963) are provided below.

{|class=wikitable
|-align=center
! GLOSS
! PROTO-SHASTA
! PROTO-PALAIHNIHAN
! PROTO-POMO
! Yana
! Karok
! Chimariko
! PROTO-YUMA
! PROTO-HOKAN
|-align=center
! 'ear'
| *ísamakʼ || *ísamaK || *išamál || malʔgu ||   || -sam || *išamárika *išamákari
| *išamarukʼa *išamákʼaru
|-align=center
! 'liver'
| *č-ímapasi || *iwapasi ||  || ima || váfiš || -ši || *imačipasí
| *č-imapasi *imačipasi
|-align=center
! 'navel'
| *ímaraw || alu (Achomawi) ||  || lakʼi || ʔárup || -napu || *imalikwí *imakwáli || *imarakʼwi *imakʼwari
|-align=center
! 'neck (nape)'
| *ímapka || *iwapaKi ||  ||  || vúˑp || -kki ||  *amipúki || *imapaki *amipaki
|-align=center
! 'nose'
| *č-imari || *yaw̃ari *iw̃ari ||  *ilaw̃a ||  ||  ||  ||  || *yamari *imari *irama
|-align=center
! 'tongue'
| ipwá (Okwanuchu) || *ipali__ || *ipál__ || bawal- || ápri-  || -pen  || *ipáli  || *ipari *ipawari *ipariwa
|}

Similar forms for 'tongue' include:
Chumash elʔew, elew < *ipariwa
Washo alŋ < *ipariwa
Salinan épal, ipaL < *ipari
Seri apɬ < *ipari
Chontal pala, peɬ- < *ipari

Similarties with Uto-Aztecan
Shaul (2019) notes the following similarities between Proto-Hokan (based on Kaufman 2015) and Proto-Uto-Aztecan.

{| class="wikitable sortable"
! Gloss (for Proto-Hokan) !! Proto-Hokan !! Proto-Uto-Aztecan
|-
| louse/flea || #ači || *atë(N) ‘louse/nit’
|-
| paternal grandfather || #apu || *apu ‘father/parent/mother’
|-
| objective case || #-i || *i ‘objective case’
|-
| come || #iyu, #iya || *ya- ‘come’
|-
| wife || #luwa, #lowa || *lowa ‘vagina’
|-
| hand || #man, #ma || *man ~ *ma ‘hand’
|-
| give || #ma ~ #mo || *maka ‘give’
|-
| woman || #mari || maːla ‘mother’ (Yoemian)
|-
| know (through magic) || #mata ~ #matu ~ #mati || *mata ~ *mati ‘know’
|-
| be a woman || #momo- || momo- ‘woman’ (Hopi)
|-
| (not quite) dead || #mu- || *mukːV ‘die (singular)’
|-
| young woman || #mus- || *muts [~ *mos] ‘vagina’
|-
| child || #ŋam || -ŋyam ‘clan’ (Hopi)
|-
| pitch/sap || #sala || *saLa ‘pitch’
|}

See also
 Chumashan languages
 Penutian languages

References

Sources

 Golla, Victor. (2011). California Indian Languages. Berkeley: University of California Press. .
Kaufman, Terrence. 1988. "A Research Program for Reconstructing Proto-Hokan: First Gropings." In Scott DeLancey, ed. Papers from the 1988 Hokan–Penutian Languages Workshop, pp. 50–168. Eugene, Oregon: Department of Linguistics, University of Oregon. (University of Oregon Papers in Linguistics. Publications of the Center for Amerindian Linguistics and Ethnography 1.)
Kaufman, Terrence. 2015a. A research program for reconstructing proto-Hokan: first gropings. Project for the Documentation of the Languages of Mesoamerica.
Kaufman, Terrence. 2015b. Some hypotheses regarding proto-Hokan grammar. Project for the Documentation of the Languages of Mesoamerica.
Marlett, Stephen A. 2007. Las relaciones entre las lenguas “hokanas” en México: ¿Cuál es la evidencia?. In Cristina Buenrostro & others (eds.), Memorias del III Coloquio Internacional de Lingüística Mauricio Swadesh, 165-192. Mexico City: Universidad Nacional Autónoma de México & Instituto Nacional de Lenguas Indígenas.
Marlett, Stephen A (2008). The Seri and Salinan connection revisited. International Journal of American Linguistics 74.3: 393–99.

Zhivlov, Mikhail. 2013. The Hokan family and lexicostatistics. Comparative-Historical Linguistics of the XXIst Century: Issues and Perspectives. Institute for Oriental and Classical Studies, Russian State University for the Humanities. Moscow, March 20-22, 2013.

External links

 (PDF) Las relaciones entre las lenguas “hokanas” en México: ¿Cuál es la evidencia? (prepublication version)
 Vocabulary Words in the Hokan Language Family

 
Indigenous languages of California
Indigenous languages of Mexico
Indigenous languages of the North American Great Basin
Indigenous languages of the North American Southwest
Indigenous languages of the Southwestern United States
Mesoamerican languages
Indigenous languages of North America
Proposed language families